Visa requirements for Kenyan citizens are administrative entry restrictions by the authorities of other states placed on citizens of Kenya. As of 2 July 2019, Kenyan citizens had visa-free or visa on arrival access to 69 countries and territories, ranking the Kenyan passport 74th in terms of travel freedom (tied with the passport of the People's Republic of China) according to the Henley Passport Index.

Visa requirements map

History
In order to comply to with the Schengen Agreement, Italy re-established the regime obligatory a visa for Kenyan citizens. From 1 January 1999, all Kenyan citizens, holders of ordinary, service and diplomatic passports need a visa to travel to Italy.

Visa requirements

Dependent, Disputed, or Restricted territories
Unrecognized or partially recognized countries

Dependent and autonomous territories

See also

Visa policy of Kenya
Kenyan passport
Visa requirements for Burundian citizens
Visa requirements for Congo DR citizens
Visa requirements for Rwandan citizens
Visa requirements for South Sudanese citizens
Visa requirements for Tanzanian citizens
Visa requirements for Ugandan citizens

References and Notes
References

Notes

Kenya
Foreign relations of Kenya